Juan Eduardo Esnáider Belén (born 5 March 1973) is an Argentine former footballer who played as a striker, currently a manager.

Having spent most of his career in Spain, he was known as a powerful player with an excellent aerial game. He started at Real Madrid in that country, having little impact with its first team and going on to represent another four clubs (mostly Real Zaragoza), amassing La Liga totals of 197 matches and 74 goals. Other than in his own country, he also competed professionally in Italy (Juventus), Portugal and France.

In 2011, Esnáider started working as a coach.

Club career
Born in Mar del Plata, Buenos Aires Province, Esnáider began his footballing career with Ferro Carril Oeste, and made his professional debut against Club Atlético Vélez Sarsfield on 2 September 1990. After only six games, he was bought by Real Madrid, and still managed two first-team appearances during the 1990–91 season, also going on to score nearly 20 goals for the reserves in Segunda División.

However, Esnáider never really settled in the main squad, and moved on loan to Real Zaragoza for 1993–94 (with the latter having the option to buy at the end of the campaign). He quickly developed into one of European football's most in-form strikers and, already property of the Aragonese side, helped them to the 1994–95 UEFA Cup Winners' Cup, scoring in the final against Arsenal and being the tournament's second-best scorer behind Ian Wright (he also added 16 in La Liga).

Real Madrid paid Zaragoza more than double they had received in July 1995, but Esnáider only netted once during another disappointing season. Signed by Atlético Madrid for 1996–97 – immediately after an historic double – he again displayed his best football, with 21 goals in all competitions.

Esnáider joined Barcelona-based RCD Espanyol after being released by Atlético, and produced another good individual season with 13 successful strikes in the league. In January 1999, he was signed by Juventus F.C. for an estimated fee of £4,5 million, as an intended replacement for Alessandro Del Piero who had just been sidelined with a serious knee injury, but was unable to settle at the Turin-based team. In late December 2000 he returned to Zaragoza and, with 11 goals in just 17 matches, helped the side avoid relegation (that included two on 14 April 2001 in a 4–4 tie at FC Barcelona), adding his second Copa del Rey in the process.

Subsequently, Esnáider's career remained low-profile, with spells at FC Porto (arriving the season after countryman Juan Antonio Pizzi, who also left unsettled after a few months), Cadetes de San Martín, Club Atlético River Plate, AC Ajaccio and Real Murcia, before retiring at Newell's Old Boys in Argentina. He obtained his coaching degree in 2008 and, in April of the following year, became Getafe CF's assistant to former Real Madrid teammate Míchel, who was replacing Víctor Muñoz after a string of bad results; he occupied the position until December 2010.

On 8 April 2013, after one full season in Segunda División B with Zaragoza's B team, Esnáider was appointed at Córdoba CF until June after the sacking of Rafael Berges. He won only two of nine games during his spell, as the team went on rank 14th in the second tier.

Esnáider returned to Getafe on 12 April 2016 following the dismissal of Fran Escribá, but now as head coach. His first match in the Spanish top flight – as a manager – took place four days later, in a 5–1 home loss to former club Real Madrid.

International career
Esnáider represented Argentina on three occasions, his debut coming in 1995. Previously, he appeared with the under-20s at the 1991 FIFA World Youth Championship held in Portugal.

Temperament
During his first spell at Zaragoza and while at Atlético Madrid, Esnáider was considered by many as one of the most promising strikers in European football. However, this was often overshadowed by his misconduct and foul play in many matches:

After missing a penalty kick in Atlético's match against AFC Ajax, in the 1996–97 edition of the UEFA Champions League, he made a ferocious two-footed tackle at Richard Witschge, but was lucky to receive only a yellow card. Minutes later, he was enraged when he was substituted by coach Radomir Antić, shouting out profanities; the next day, he was transferlisted by illusive chairman Jesús Gil.

In 2000–01's dying stages, as Zaragoza fought to retain their top-division status, Esnáider brutally assaulted a RC Celta de Vigo player with his elbow (with the consequent dismissal), allegedly after being told by the club he would be deemed surplus to requirements for the following season. The player denied, however, this as the main reason for the incident.

At the 1991 World Youth Championships, Esnáider was sent off for headbutting referee Guy Goethals and calling him a "son of a whore". He was banned from international football for a year, and Argentina were disqualified from the following edition of the tournament.

Personal life
Esnáider's son, also named Juan, was also a footballer and a forward. He too represented Zaragoza.

On Christmas Day 2012, Esnáider lost a 17-year-old son to illness. His surname was a Spanish spelling of the German Schneider, which meant "tailor", and he was of Volga German and Spanish descent.

Managerial statistics

Honours
Real Madrid
Copa del Rey: 1992–93

Zaragoza
Copa del Rey: 1993–94, 2000–01
UEFA Cup Winners' Cup: 1994–95

Juventus
UEFA Intertoto Cup: 1999 

River Plate
Argentine Primera División: 2002 Clausura

References

External links

1973 births
Living people
Argentine people of Volga German descent
Argentine sportspeople of Spanish descent
Sportspeople from Mar del Plata
Argentine footballers
Association football forwards
Argentine Primera División players
Ferro Carril Oeste footballers
Cadetes de San Martín players
Club Atlético River Plate footballers
Newell's Old Boys footballers
La Liga players
Segunda División players
Real Madrid Castilla footballers
Real Madrid CF players
Real Zaragoza players
Atlético Madrid footballers
RCD Espanyol footballers
Real Murcia players
Serie A players
Juventus F.C. players
Primeira Liga players
FC Porto players
Ligue 1 players
AC Ajaccio players
Argentina under-20 international footballers
Argentina international footballers
Argentine expatriate footballers
Expatriate footballers in Spain
Expatriate footballers in Italy
Expatriate footballers in Portugal
Expatriate footballers in France
Argentine expatriate sportspeople in Spain
Argentine expatriate sportspeople in Italy
Argentine expatriate sportspeople in Portugal
Argentine expatriate sportspeople in France
Argentine football managers
La Liga managers
Segunda División managers
Segunda División B managers
Córdoba CF managers
Getafe CF managers
J2 League managers
JEF United Chiba managers
Argentine expatriate football managers
Expatriate football managers in Spain
Expatriate football managers in Japan
Argentine expatriate sportspeople in Japan